is a Japanese diplomat. From 2011 to 2016, he served as the Japanese ambassador to the United Kingdom.

Biography
Keiichi Hayashi was born on 8 February 1951 in Yamaguchi Prefecture.

In 1973, Hayashi stayed in Folkestone, in the UK, for three months to attend an English language school. One of his English teachers was the wife of a retired diplomat, and this encouraged him to pursue a career as a diplomat.

Career
In 1974, Hayashi joined the Ministry of Foreign Affairs.

From 1996, Hayashi spent three years at the Embassy in London, first as a political counsellor, and then as a political minister.

He served as Japanese Ambassador to Ireland from 2005 to 2008.

He returned to the UK in 2010 as Minister Plenipotentiary to the UK.

On 11 January 2011, he was appointed Japanese ambassador to the United Kingdom.

Hayashi attended the wedding of Prince William and Catherine Middleton at Westminster Abbey in London on 29 April 2011, officially representing Japan in place of the Emperor and Empress of Japan, who had to decline following the Great East Japan earthquake of 11 March 2011.

References

External links
 Official blog 
 

Ambassadors of Japan to Ireland
Ambassadors of Japan to the United Kingdom
People from Yamaguchi Prefecture
1951 births
Living people
Kyoto University alumni
Stanford University alumni